Hélène Rose Paule Grimaud (born 7 November 1969) is a French classical pianist and the founder of the Wolf Conservation Center in South Salem, New York.

Early life and education
Grimaud was born in Aix-en-Provence, France. She described family nationalities in a New York Times interview with John Rockwell: "My father came from a background of Sephardi Jews in Africa, and my mother's ancestors were Jewish Berbers from Corsica." Her father was adopted as a child by a French family and he became a university tutor teaching languages.   According to Luc Antonini   the name Grimaud is typical of the region of Trets in Provence. She discovered the piano at seven. In 1982, she entered the Conservatoire de Paris, where she studied with Jacques Rouvier. In 1985, she won 1st Prize at the Conservatory and the Grand Prix du Disque of the Académie Charles Cros for her recording of the Rachmaninoff Piano Sonata No. 2.

She experiences synesthesia, where one physical sense adds to another, in her case seeing music as colour, which helps her with memorising music scores.

Career
Grimaud has established herself not only as a virtuoso pianist, but also as a committed wildlife conservationist, a compassionate human rights activist and as a writer.

She began her piano studies at the local conservatory with Jacqueline Courtin before going on to work with Pierre Barbizet in Marseille. She was accepted into the Paris Conservatoire at just 13 and won first prize in piano performance a mere three years later. She continued to study with György Sándor and Leon Fleisher until, in 1987, she gave her well-received debut recital in Tokyo. That same year, renowned conductor Daniel Barenboim invited her to perform with the Orchestre de Paris: this marked the launch of Grimaud's musical career, characterised ever since by concerts with most of the world's major orchestras and many celebrated conductors.

Between her debut in 1995 with the Berliner Philharmoniker under Claudio Abbado and her first performance with the New York Philharmonic under Kurt Masur in 1999 – just two of many notable musical milestones – Grimaud made a wholly different kind of debut: in upper New York State, she established the Wolf Conservation Center.

Her love for the endangered species was sparked by a chance encounter with a wolf in northern Florida; this led to her determination to open an environmental education centre. "When you look at a wolf in the eye, you establish a connection," Ms. Grimaud said. "Hearing about wolves and seeing a wolf are two very different things. It’s about accomplishing the goals of outreach — building a bridge of understanding to our counterparts in the wild — and environmental conservation. If you call me an activist, I’m happy." But Grimaud's engagement does not end there: she is also a member of the organisation Musicians for Human Rights, a worldwide network of musicians and people working in the field of music to promote a culture of human rights and social change.

For a number of years, she also found time to pursue a writing career, publishing three books that have appeared in various languages. Her first, Variations Sauvages, appeared in 2003. It was followed in 2005 by Leçons particulières, and in 2013 by Retour à Salem, both semi-autobiographical novels.

It is, however, through her music-making that Hélène Grimaud most deeply touches the emotions of audiences. She tours extensively as a soloist and recitalist. A committed chamber musician, she has also performed at the most prestigious festivals and cultural events with a wide range of musical collaborators, including Sol Gabetta, Rolando Villazón, Jan Vogler, Truls Mørk, Clemens Hagen, Gidon Kremer, Gil Shaham and the Capuçon brothers. Her contribution to and impact on the world of classical music were recognised by the French government when she was admitted into the Ordre National de la Légion d’Honneur (France's highest decoration) at the rank of Chevalier (Knight).

Grimaud has been an exclusive Deutsche Grammophon artist since 2002. Her recordings have been critically acclaimed and awarded numerous accolades, among them the Cannes Classical Recording of the Year, Choc du Monde de la musique, Diapason d’or, Grand Prix du disque, Record Academy Prize (Tokyo), Midem Classic Award and the Echo Klassik Award.

Her early recordings include Credo and Reflection (both of which feature a number of thematically linked works); a Chopin and Rachmaninov Sonatas disc; a Bartók CD on which she plays the Third Piano Concerto with the London Symphony Orchestra and Pierre Boulez; a Beethoven disc with the Staatskapelle Dresden and Vladimir Jurowski which was chosen as one of history's greatest classical music albums in the iTunes "Classical Essentials" series; a selection of Bach’s solo and concerto works, in which she directed the Deutsche Kammerphilharmonie Bremen from the piano; and a DVD release of Rachmaninov’s Second Piano Concerto with the Lucerne Festival Orchestra and Claudio Abbado.

In 2010 Grimaud recorded the solo recital album Resonances, showcasing music by Mozart, Berg, Liszt and Bartók. This was followed in 2011 by a disc featuring her readings of Mozart’s Piano Concertos Nos. 19 and 23 as well as a collaboration with singer Mojca Erdmann in the same composer’s Ch’io mi scordi di te?. Her next release, Duo, recorded with cellist Sol Gabetta, won the 2013 Echo Klassik Award for "chamber recording of the year", and her album of the two Brahms piano concertos, the First recorded with Andris Nelsons and the Bavarian Radio Symphony Orchestra, the Second with Nelsons and the Vienna Philharmonic, appeared in September 2013.

This was followed by Water (January 2016), a live recording of performances from tears become… streams become…, the critically-acclaimed large-scale immersive installation at New York's Park Avenue Armory created by Turner Prize-winning artist Douglas Gordon in collaboration with Grimaud. Water features works by nine composers: Berio, Takemitsu, Fauré, Ravel, Albéniz, Liszt, Janáček, Debussy and Nitin Sawhney, who wrote seven short Water Transitions for the album as well as producing it. April 2017 then saw the release of Perspectives, a two-disc personal selection of highlights from her DG catalogue, including two "encores" – Brahms's Waltz in A flat and Sgambati's arrangement of Gluck’s "Dance of the Blessed Spirits" – previously unreleased on CD/via streaming.

Grimaud's next album, Memory, was released in September 2018. Exploring music's ability to bring the past back to life, it comprises a selection of evanescent miniatures by Chopin, Debussy, Satie and Valentin Silvestrov which, in the pianist's own words, "conjure atmospheres of fragile reflection, a mirage of what was – or what could have been".

For her latest recording, The Messenger, Grimaud has created an intriguing dialogue between Silvestrov and Mozart. "I was always interested in couplings that were not predictable," she explains, "because I feel as if certain pieces can shed a special light on to one another." She is joined by the Camerata Salzburg in Mozart's Piano Concerto K466 and Silvestrov's Two Dialogues with Postscript and The Messenger – 1996, of which she also performs a solo version. Completing the programme are Mozart's Fantasias K397 and K475. The Messenger was released on 2 October 2020.

Highlights of the pianist's 2019–20 season included performances of Bartók’s Piano Concerto No. 3 in Philadelphia and at Carnegie Hall with the Philadelphia Orchestra and Yannick Nézet-Séguin; Ravel's Concerto in G major with MusicAeterna and Teodor Currentzis in Luxembourg and Munich; and the Ravel Concerto and Mozart's Piano Concerto K466 on tour in Germany with the Bamberger Symphoniker and Jakub Hrůša, as well as recitals in North America featuring repertoire from Memory.

Critical reception 
Critics have praised Grimaud's willingness to reinterpret works and take chances, and compared her to Glenn Gould: 
Grimaud doesn't sound like most pianists: she is a rubato artist, a reinventor of phrasings, a taker of chances. "A wrong note that is played out of élan, you hear it differently than one that is played out of fear," she says. She admires the "more extreme players . . . people who wouldn't be afraid to play their conception to the end." Her two overriding characteristics are independence and drive, and her performances attempt, whenever possible, to shake up conventional pianistic wisdom. Brian Levine, the executive director of the Glenn Gould Foundation, sees in Grimaud a resemblance to Gould: "She has this willingness to take a piece of music apart and free herself from the general body of practice that has grown up around it."

Personal life
In 1991, at age 21, Grimaud moved to Tallahassee, Florida. In 1997, she settled in Westchester County, north of New York City. After some time spent in Berlin, she took up residence in Weggis, near Luzern, Switzerland.

She has a passion for wolves and wolf conservation. She now divides her time between her musical career and the Wolf Conservation Center in South Salem, New York.

Grimaud lives with her partner, the German photographer Mat Hennek, in California and Upstate New York.

Honours
 Ordre des Arts et des Lettres (2002).
 National Order of Merit (France) (16 May 2008).
 Legion of Honour (3 April 2015).

Discography
On Denon
 Rachmaninoff Piano Sonata No. 2, Études-Tableaux, Op. 33 (1986)
 Chopin Ballade No. 1, Liszt Après une Lecture de Dante, Schumann Sonata for Piano (1987)
 Schumann Kreisleriana, Brahms Piano Sonata No. 2 (1989)
 Brahms Piano Sonata No. 3, Klavierstücke (1992)
 Rachmaninoff Piano Concerto No. 2, Ravel Piano Concerto (1993)

On Erato
 Schumann Piano Concerto, Richard Strauss Burleske (1995)
 Brahms Piano Pieces Op. 116–119 (1996)
 Gershwin Piano Concerto, Ravel Piano Concerto in G (1997)
 Brahms Piano Concerto No. 1 (1998)

On Teldec
 Beethoven Piano Concerto No. 4, Piano Sonata No. 30, Piano Sonata No. 31 (1999)
 Rachmaninoff Piano Concerto No. 2, Prelude Op. 32/12, Études-Tableaux Op. 33/1, 2 and 9, Variations on a Theme of Corelli (2001)

On Deutsche Grammophon
 Credo  John Corigliano Fantasia on an Ostinato, Beethoven Piano Sonata No. 17 "Tempest", Choral Fantasy, Arvo Pärt Credo (2003)
 Chopin | Rachmaninoff (2005)
 Bartók The Piano Concertos (on the third) (2005)
 Reflection Schumann Piano Concerto, Various by Brahms and Clara Schumann (2006)
 Beethoven Piano Concerto No. 5 "Emperor", Piano Sonata No. 28 (2007)
 Bach Various (2008)
 Resonances Mozart: Sonata No. 8, Berg: Sonata op.1, Liszt: Sonata in B minor, Bartok: Romanian Folk Dances (2010)
 Mozart Piano Concerto No. 19, Piano Concerto No. 23, Ch'io mi scordi di te? (with Mojca Erdmann, soprano) (2011)
 Duo (with Sol Gabetta, cello) Works by Schumann, Brahms, Debussy, and Shostakovich (2012)
 Brahms Piano Concertos Nos. 1 & 2 with the Bavarian Radio SO and Vienna PO, conducted by Andris Nelsons (2013)
 Water Various (with Nitin Sawhney) (2016)
 Memory Debussy (including "Clair de Lune"), Satie, Chopin, Silvestrov, Sawhney  (2018)
 The Messenger Mozart, Silvestrov with Camerata Salzburg (2020)

On Philips
 Schumann Sonata for Violin and Piano in A minor, Op. 105, Gidon Kremer violin and Helene Grimaud piano. Recording date: 7/1989. Release: Lockenhaus Festival 1982–1992 A Decade of Music-Making (1997)

On ACA Digital Recording, Inc
 Bassoon Music Of The Americas, Composers on Bassoon Music Of The Americas: Alvin Etler, Valdir Azevedo, Jose Siqueira, Magda Santos/Pó, Pixinguinha, Heitor Villa-Lobos, Willson Osborne. Jeff Keesecker – bassoon and Hélène Grimaud – piano (2002)

Bibliography
 Variations sauvages (2003, published in English as Wild Harmonies)
 Leçons particulières (2005)
 Retour à Salem (2013)

Notes

References

Other sources

External links 
 
 
 Wolf Conservation Center

+
Classical
Pianists
20th-century French women classical pianists
Jewish classical pianists
French people of Algerian-Berber descent
1969 births
Living people
Musicians from Aix-en-Provence
Conservatoire de Paris alumni
French conservationists
French expatriates in Switzerland
French people of Corsican descent
French people of Italian-Jewish descent
Knights of the Ordre national du Mérite
Officiers of the Ordre des Arts et des Lettres
Chevaliers of the Légion d'honneur
21st-century classical pianists
Erato Records artists